This is a comprehensive listing of the bird species recorded in Everglades National Park, which is in the U.S. state of Florida. This list is based on one published by the National Park Service (NPS) dated June 21, 2022.

Of the 375 species included here, 13 have been introduced to North America, three have been extirpated, and one is extinct. Unless otherwise noted, introduced species which do not have established populations in Florida are not included.

This list is presented in the taxonomic sequence of the Check-list of North and Middle American Birds, 7th edition through the 63rd Supplement, published by the American Ornithological Society (AOS). Common and scientific names are also those of the Check-list, except that the common names of families are from the Clements taxonomy because the AOS list does not include them.

The following tags have been used to annotate some species:

(I) Introduced - a species that has been introduced to North America by the actions of humans, either directly or indirectly
(e) Extirpated - a species that is no longer in Florida, but exists elsewhere
(E) Extinct -  a recent species that no longer exists

Ducks, geese, and waterfowl
Order: AnseriformesFamily: Anatidae

The family Anatidae includes the ducks and most duck-like waterfowl, such as geese and swans. These birds are adapted to an aquatic existence with webbed feet, flattened bills, and feathers that are excellent at shedding water due to special oils.

Black-bellied whistling-duck, Dendrocygna autumnalis 
Fulvous whistling-duck, Dendrocygna bicolor
Snow goose, Anser caerulescens 
Brant, Branta bernicla 
Canada goose, Branta canadensis 
Egyptian goose, Alopochen aegyptiaca (I)
Muscovy duck, Cairina moschata (I)
Wood duck, Aix sponsa 
Blue-winged teal, Spatula discors
Cinnamon teal, Spatula cyanoptera 
Northern shoveler, Spatula clypeata
Gadwall, Mareca strepera 
Eurasian wigeon, Mareca penelope 
American wigeon, Mareca americana
Mallard, Anas platyrhynchos 
American black duck, Anas rubripes 
Mottled duck, Anas fulvigula
White-cheeked pintail, Anas bahamensis 
Northern pintail, Anas acuta
Green-winged teal, Anas crecca carolinensis
Canvasback, Aythya valisineria 
Redhead, Aythya americana 
Ring-necked duck, Aythya collaris
Greater scaup, Aythya marila 
Lesser scaup, Aythya affinis
Common eider, Somateria mollissima 
Surf scoter, Melanitta perspicillata 
White-winged scoter, Melanitta deglandi 
Black scoter, Melanitta americana 
Long-tailed duck, Clangula hyemalis 
Bufflehead, Bucephala albeola 
Common goldeneye, Bucephala clangula 
Hooded merganser, Lophodytes cucullatus
Red-breasted merganser, Mergus serrator
Masked duck, Nomonyx dominicus 
Ruddy duck, Oxyura jamaicensis

New World quail
Order: GalliformesFamily: Odontophoridae

The New World quails are small, plump terrestrial birds only distantly related to the quails of the Old World, but named for their similar appearance and habits.

Northern bobwhite, Colinus virginianus

Pheasants, grouse, and allies
Order: GalliformesFamily: Phasianidae

The Phasianidae is the family containing the pheasants and their allies. These are terrestrial birds, variable in size but generally plump, with broad, relatively short wings. Many are gamebirds or have been domesticated as a food source for humans.

Wild turkey, Meleagris gallopavo
Common peafowl, Pavo cristatus (I)

Flamingoes
Order: PhoenicopteriformesFamily: Phoenicopteridae

Flamingos filter-feed on shellfish and algae. Their oddly shaped beaks are adapted to separate mud and silt from the food they consume and, uniquely, are used upside-down.

American flamingo, Phoenicopterus ruber

Grebes
Order: PodicipediformesFamily: Podicipedidae

Grebes are small to medium-large freshwater diving birds. They have lobed toes and are excellent swimmers and divers. However, they have their feet placed far back on the body, making them quite ungainly on land.

Pied-billed grebe, Podilymbus podiceps
Horned grebe, Podiceps auritus
Red-necked grebe, Podiceps grisegena 
Eared grebe, Podiceps nigricollis

Pigeons and doves
Order: ColumbiformesFamily: Columbidae

Pigeons and doves are stout-bodied birds with short necks, and short slender bills with a fleshy cere.

Rock pigeon, Columba livia (I) 
White-crowned pigeon, Patagioenas leucocephala
Eurasian collared-dove, Streptopelia decaocto (I)
Common ground dove, Columbina passerina
Key West quail-dove, Geotrygon chrysia 
White-winged dove, Zenaida asiatica 
Zenaida dove, Zenaida aurita 
Mourning dove, Zenaida macroura

Cuckoos
Order: CuculiformesFamily: Cuculidae

The family Cuculidae includes cuckoos, roadrunners, and anis. These birds are of variable size with slender bodies, long tails, and strong legs.

Smooth-billed ani, Crotophaga ani
Groove-billed ani, Crotophaga sulcirostris 
Yellow-billed cuckoo, Coccyzus americanus
Mangrove cuckoo, Coccyzus minor
Black-billed cuckoo, Coccyzus erythropthalmus

Nightjars and allies
Order: CaprimulgiformesFamily: Caprimulgidae

Nightjars are medium-sized nocturnal birds that usually nest on the ground. They have long wings, short legs, and very short bills. Most have small feet, of little use for walking, and long pointed wings. Their soft plumage is cryptically colored to resemble bark or leaves.

Lesser nighthawk, Chordeiles acutipennis 
Common nighthawk, Chordeiles minor
Antillean nighthawk, Chordeiles gundlachii 
Chuck-will's-widow, Antrostomus carolinensis
Eastern whip-poor-will, Antrostomus vociferus

Swifts
Order: ApodiformesFamily: Apodidae

The swifts are small birds, spending most of their lives flying. They have very short legs and never settle voluntarily on the ground, perching instead only on vertical surfaces. Many swifts have very long swept-back wings which resemble a crescent or boomerang.

Chimney swift, Chaetura pelagica

Hummingbirds
Order: ApodiformesFamily: Trochilidae

Hummingbirds are small birds capable of hovering in mid-air due to the rapid flapping of their wings. They are the only birds that can fly backwards.

Ruby-throated hummingbird, Archilochus colubris
Rufous hummingbird, Selasphorus rufus

Rails, gallinules, and coots
Order: GruiformesFamily: Rallidae

The Rallidae is a large family of small to medium-sized birds which includes the rails, crakes, coots, and gallinules. The most typical family members occupy dense vegetation in damp environments near lakes, swamps, or rivers. In general they are shy and secretive, making them difficult to observe. Most have strong legs with long toes, short rounded wings, and are weak fliers.

Clapper rail, Rallus crepitans
King rail, Rallus elegans
Virginia rail, Rallus limicola 
Sora, Porzana carolina
Common gallinule, Gallinula galeata
American coot, Fulica americana
Purple gallinule, Porphyrio martinicus
Gray-headed swamphen, Porphyrio porphyrio (I)
Yellow rail, Coturnicops noveboracensis 
Black rail, Laterallus jamaicensis

Limpkin
Order: GruiformesFamily: Aramidae

The limpkin is an odd bird that looks like a large rail, but is skeletally closer to the cranes. It is found in marshes with some trees or scrub in the Caribbean, South America, and southern Florida.

Limpkin, Aramus guarauna

Cranes
Order: GruiformesFamily: Gruidae

Cranes are large, tall birds with long legs and long necks. Unlike the similar-looking but un-related herons, cranes fly with necks extended. Most have elaborate and noisy courtship displays or "dances". When in a group, they may also "dance" for no particular reason, jumping up and down in an elegant manner, seemingly just for pleasure or to attract a mate.

Sandhill crane, Antigone canadensis

Stilts and avocets
Order: CharadriiformesFamily: Recurvirostridae

Recurvirostridae is a family of large wading birds which includes the avocets and stilts. The avocets have long legs and long up-curved bills. The stilts have extremely long legs and long, thin, straight bills.

Black-necked stilt, Himantopus mexicanus
American avocet, Recurvirostra americana

Oystercatchers
Order: CharadriiformesFamily: Haematopodidae

The oystercatchers are large, conspicuous and noisy plover-like birds, with strong bills used for smashing or prising open molluscs.

American oystercatcher, Haematopus palliatus

Plovers and lapwings
Order: CharadriiformesFamily: Charadriidae

The family Charadriidae includes the plovers, dotterels, and lapwings. They are small to medium-sized birds with compact bodies, short thick necks, and long, usually pointed, wings. They are generally found in open country, mostly in habitats near water.

Black-bellied plover, Pluvialis squatarola
American golden-plover, Pluviali dominicas
Killdeer, Charadrius vociferus
Semipalmated plover, Charadrius semipalmatus
Piping plover, Charadrius melodus 
Wilson's plover, Charadrius wilsonia
Snowy plover, Charadrius nivosus

Sandpipers and allies
Order: CharadriiformesFamily: Scolopacidae

Scolopacidae is a large and diverse family of small to medium-sized shorebirds which includes the sandpipers, curlews, godwits, shanks, tattlers, woodcocks, snipes, dowitchers, and phalaropes. Most eat small invertebrates picked out of the mud or sand. Different lengths of legs and bills enable multiple species to feed in the same habitat, particularly on the coast, without direct competition for food.

Upland sandpiper, Bartramia longicauda 
Whimbrel, Numenius phaeopus
Long-billed curlew, Numenius americanus 
Bar-tailed godwit, Limosa lapponica 
Black-tailed godwit, Limosa limosa 
Hudsonian godwit, Limosa haemastica 
Marbled godwit, Limosa fedoa
Ruddy turnstone, Arenaria interpres
Red knot, Calidris canutus
Ruff, Calidris pugnax 
Sharp-tailed sandpiper, Calidris acuminata (A)
Stilt sandpiper, Calidris himantopus
Curlew sandpiper, Calidris ferruginea 
Sanderling, Calidris alba
Dunlin, Calidris alpina
Baird's sandpiper, Calidris bairdii 
Least sandpiper, Calidris minutilla
White-rumped sandpiper, Calidris fuscicollis 
Buff-breasted sandpiper, Calidris subruficollis 
Pectoral sandpiper, Calidris melanotos
Semipalmated sandpiper, Calidris pusilla
Western sandpiper, Calidris mauri
Short-billed dowitcher, Limnodromus griseus
Long-billed dowitcher, Limnodromus scolopaceus
Wilson's snipe, Gallinago delicata
American woodcock, Scolopax minor 
Spotted sandpiper, Actitis macularius
Solitary sandpiper, Tringa solitaria
Lesser yellowlegs, Tringa flavipes
Willet, Tringa semipalmata
Greater yellowlegs, Tringa melanoleuca
Wilson's phalarope, Phalaropus tricolor 
Red-necked phalarope, Phalaropus lobatus

Skuas and jaegers
Order: CharadriiformesFamily: Stercorariidae

Skuas and jaegers are medium to large seabirds, typically with gray or brown plumage, often with white markings on the wings. They have longish bills with hooked tips and webbed feet with sharp claws. They look like large dark gulls, but have a fleshy cere above the upper mandible. They are strong, acrobatic fliers.

Pomarine jaeger, Stercorarius pomarinus 
Parasitic jaeger, Stercorarius parasiticus

Gulls, terns, and skimmers
Order: CharadriiformesFamily: Laridae

The Laridae are a family of medium to large seabirds and containing the gulls, terns, kittiwakes, and skimmers. They are typically gray or white, often with black markings on the head or wings. They have stout, longish bills and webbed feet.

Bonaparte's gull, Chroicocephalus philadelphia
Laughing gull, Leucophaeus atricilla
Franklin's gull, Leucophaeus pipixcan 
Ring-billed gull, Larus delawarensis
Herring gull, Larus argentatus
Lesser black-backed gull, Larus fuscus 
Great black-backed gull, Larus marinus 
Brown noddy, Anous stolidus 
Sooty tern, Onychoprion fuscata 
Bridled tern, Onychoprion anaethetus 
Least tern, Sternula antillarum
Gull-billed tern, Gelochelidon nilotica
Caspian tern, Hydroprogne caspia
Black tern, Chlidonias niger
Roseate tern, Sterna dougallii 
Common tern, Sterna hirundo
Forster's tern, Sterna forsteri
Royal tern, Thalasseus maxima
Sandwich tern, Thalasseus sandvicensis
Black skimmer, Rynchops niger

Loons
Order: GaviiformesFamily: Gaviidae

Loons are aquatic birds the size of a large duck, to which they are unrelated. Their plumage is largely gray or black and they have spear-shaped bills. Loons swim well and fly adequately but, because their legs are placed towards the rear of the body, are clumsy on land.

Red-throated loon, Gavia stellata 
Common loon, Gavia immer

Southern storm-petrels
Order: ProcellariiformesFamily: Oceanitidae

The storm-petrels are the smallest seabirds, relatives of the petrels, feeding on planktonic crustaceans and small fish picked from the surface, typically while hovering. The flight is fluttering and sometimes bat-like. Until 2018, this family's three species were included with the other storm-petrels in family Hydrobatidae.

Wilson's storm-petrel, Oceanites oceanicus

Northern storm-petrels
Order: ProcellariiformesFamily: Hydrobatidae

Though the members of this family are similar in many respects to the southern storm-petrels, including their general appearance and habits, there are enough genetic differences to warrant their placement in a separate family.

Leach's storm-petrel, Hydrobates leucorhous

Shearwaters and petrels
Order: ProcellariiformesFamily: Procellariidae

The procellariids are the main group of medium-sized "true petrels", characterized by united tubular nostrils with a median septum.

Great shearwater, Ardenna gravis 
Sooty shearwater, Ardenna griseus 
Audubon's shearwater, Puffinus lherminieri

Storks
Order: CiconiiformesFamily: Ciconiidae

Storks are large, heavy, long-legged, long-necked wading birds with long stout bills and wide wingspans. They lack the powder down that other wading birds such as herons, spoonbills and ibises use to clean off fish slime. Storks lack a pharynx and are mute.

Wood stork, Mycteria americana

Frigatebirds
Order: SuliformesFamily: Fregatidae

Frigatebirds are large seabirds usually found over tropical oceans. They are large, black, or black-and-white, with long wings and deeply forked tails. The males have colored inflatable throat pouches. They do not swim or walk and cannot take off from a flat surface. Having the largest wingspan-to-body-weight ratio of any bird, they are essentially aerial, able to stay aloft for more than a week.

Magnificent frigatebird, Fregata magnificens

Boobies and gannets
Order: SuliformesFamily: Sulidae

The sulids comprise the gannets and boobies. Both groups are medium-large coastal seabirds that plunge-dive for fish.

Brown booby, Sula leucogaster 
Northern gannet, Morus bassanus

Anhingas
Order: SuliformesFamily: Anhingidae

Anhingas, also known as darters or snakebirds, are cormorant-like water birds with long necks and long, straight beaks. They are fish eaters, diving for long periods, and often swim with only their neck above the water, looking rather like a water snake.

Anhinga, Anhinga anhinga

Cormorants and shags
Order: SuliformesFamily: Phalacrocoracidae

Cormorants are medium-to-large aquatic birds, usually with mainly dark plumage and areas of colored skin on the face. The bill is long, thin and sharply hooked. Their feet are four-toed and webbed.

Great cormorant, Phalacrocorax carbo 
Double-crested cormorant, Nannopterum auritum
Neotropic cormorant, Nannopterum brasilianum

Pelicans
Order: PelecaniformesFamily: Pelecanidae

Pelicans are very large water birds with a distinctive pouch under their beak. Like other birds in the order Pelecaniformes, they have four webbed toes.

American white pelican, Pelecanus erythrorhynchos
Brown pelican, Pelecanus occidentalis

Herons, egrets, and bitterns
Order: PelecaniformesFamily: Ardeidae

The family Ardeidae contains the herons, egrets and bitterns. Herons and egrets are wading birds with long necks and legs. Herons are large and egrets are smaller. Bitterns tend to be shorter-necked and more secretive. Unlike other long-necked birds such as storks, ibises, and spoonbills, members of the Ardeidae fly with their necks pulled back into a curve.

American bittern, Botaurus lentiginosus
Least bittern, Ixobrychus exilis
Great blue heron, Ardea herodias
Great egret, Ardea alba
Snowy egret, Egretta thula
Little blue heron, Egretta caerulea
Tricolored heron, Egretta tricolor
Reddish egret, Egretta rufescens
Cattle egret, Bubulcus ibis
Green heron, Butorides virescens
Black-crowned night-heron, Nycticorax nycticorax
Yellow-crowned night-heron, Nyctanassa violacea

Ibises and spoonbills
Order: PelecaniformesFamily: Threskiornithidae

The family Threskiornithidae includes the ibises and spoonbills. They have long, broad wings. Their bodies are elongated, the neck more so, with long legs. The bill is also long, curved downward in the ibises, straight and markedly flattened in the spoonbills.

White ibis, Eudocimus albus
Scarlet ibis, Eudocimus ruber  (Probably (I))
Glossy ibis, Plegadis falcinellus
White-faced ibis, Plegadis chihi 
Roseate spoonbill, Platalea ajaja

New World vultures
Order: CathartiformesFamily: Cathartidae

New World vultures are not closely related to Old World vultures, but superficially resemble them because of convergent evolution. Like the Old World vultures, they are scavengers. Unlike Old World vultures, which find carcasses by sight, New World vultures have a good sense of smell with which they locate carcasses.

Black vulture, Coragyps atratus
Turkey vulture, Cathartes aura

Osprey
Order: AccipitriformesFamily: Pandionidae

Pandionidae is a family of fish-eating birds of prey, possessing a very large, powerful hooked beak for tearing flesh from their prey, strong legs, powerful talons, and keen eyesight. The family is monotypic.

Osprey, Pandion haliaetus

Hawks, eagles, and kites
Order: AccipitriformesFamily: Accipitridae

Accipitridae is a family of birds of prey that includes hawks, eagles, kites, harriers and Old World vultures. They have very large, hooked beaks for tearing flesh from their prey, strong legs, powerful talons, and keen eyesight.

White-tailed kite, Elanus leucurus
Swallow-tailed kite, Elanoides forficatus
Golden eagle, Aquila chrysaetos 
Northern harrier, Circus hudsonius
Sharp-shinned hawk, Accipiter striatus
Cooper's hawk, Accipiter cooperii 
Bald eagle, Haliaeetus leucocephalus
Mississippi kite, Ictinia mississippiensis 
Snail kite, Rostrhamus sociabilis
Red-shouldered hawk, Buteo lineatus
Broad-winged hawk, Buteo platypterus
Short-tailed hawk, Buteo brachyurus
Swainson's hawk, Buteo swainsoni
Red-tailed hawk, Buteo jamaicensis
Rough-legged hawk, Buteo lagopus

Barn-owls
Order: StrigiformesFamily: Tytonidae

Barn owls are medium to large owls with large heads and characteristic heart-shaped faces. They have long strong legs with powerful talons.

Barn owl, Tyto alba

Owls
Order: StrigiformesFamily: Strigidae

Typical owls are small to large solitary nocturnal birds of prey. They have large forward-facing eyes and ears, a hawk-like beak, and a conspicuous circle of feathers around each eye called a facial disk.

Eastern screech-owl, Megascops asio
Great horned owl, Bubo virginianus
Burrowing owl, Athene cunicularia
Barred owl, Strix varia
Short-eared owl, Asio flammeus

Kingfishers
Order: CoraciiformesFamily: Alcedinidae

Kingfishers are medium-sized birds with large heads, long pointed bills, short legs, and stubby tails.

Belted kingfisher, Megaceryle alcyon

Woodpeckers
Order: PiciformesFamily: Picidae

Woodpeckers are small to medium-sized birds with chisel-like beaks, short legs, stiff tails, and long tongues used for capturing insects. Some species have feet with two toes pointing forward and two backward, while several species have only three toes. Many woodpeckers have the habit of tapping noisily on tree trunks with their beaks.

Red-headed woodpecker, Melanerpes erythrocephalus 
Red-bellied woodpecker, Melanerpes carolinus
Yellow-bellied sapsucker, Sphyrapicus varius
Downy woodpecker, Dryobates pubescens
Red-cockaded woodpecker, Dryobates borealis (e)
Hairy woodpecker, Dryobates villosus 
Northern flicker, Colaptes auratus
Pileated woodpecker, Dryocopus pileatus
Ivory-billed woodpecker, Campephilus principalis

Falcons and caracaras
Order: FalconiformesFamily: Falconidae

The Falconidae is a family of diurnal birds of prey containing the falcons and caracaras. They differ from hawks, eagles, and kites in that they kill with their beaks instead of their talons.

Crested caracara, Caracara plancus 
American kestrel, Falco sparverius
Merlin, Falco columbarius
Peregrine falcon, Falco peregrinus

New World and African parrots
Order: PsittaciformesFamily: Psittacidae

Characteristic features of parrots include a strong curved bill, an upright stance, strong legs, and clawed zygodactyl feet. Many parrots are vividly colored, and some are multi-colored. Most of the more than 150 species in this family are found in the New World.

Carolina parakeet, Conuropsis carolinensis (E)
Monk parakeet, Myiopsitta monachus (I)

Old World parrots
Order: PsittaciformesFamily: Psittaculidae

Old World parrots are found from Africa east across south and southeast Asia and Oceania to Australia and New Zealand.

Budgerigar, Melopsittacus undulatus (I) (e) ("Disestablished" per the FOSRC)

Tyrant flycatchers
Order: PasseriformesFamily: Tyrannidae

Tyrant flycatchers are passerines which occur throughout North and South America. They superficially resemble the Old World flycatchers, but are more robust and have stronger bills. They do not have the sophisticated vocal capabilities of the songbirds. Most, but not all, are rather plain. As the name implies, most are insectivorous.

Great crested flycatcher, Myiarchus crinitus
Brown-crested flycatcher, Myiarchus tyrannulus
La Sagra's flycatcher, Myiarchus sagrae 
Tropical kingbird, Tyrannus melancholicus 
Western kingbird, Tyrannus verticalis
Eastern kingbird, Tyrannus tyrannus
Gray kingbird, Tyrannus dominicensis
Scissor-tailed flycatcher, Tyrannus forficatus 
Fork-tailed flycatcher, Tyrannus savana 
Eastern wood-pewee, Contopus virens
Cuban pewee, Contopus caribaeus 
Yellow-bellied flycatcher, Empidonax flaviventris 
Acadian flycatcher, Empidonax virescens 
Alder flycatcher, Empidonax alnorum 
Willow flycatcher, Empidonax traillii 
Least flycatcher, Empidonax minimus
Eastern phoebe, Sayornis phoebe
Say's phoebe, Sayornis saya 
Vermilion flycatcher, Pyrocephalus rubinus

Vireos, shrike-babblers, and erpornis
Order: PasseriformesFamily: Vireonidae

The vireos are a group of small to medium-sized passerines restricted to the New World. They are typically greenish in color and resemble wood-warblers apart from their heavier bills.

White-eyed vireo, Vireo griseus
Thick-billed vireo, Vireo crassirostris 
Bell's vireo, Vireo bellii 
Yellow-throated vireo, Vireo flavifrons
Blue-headed vireo, Vireo solitarius
Philadelphia vireo, Vireo philadelphicus 
Red-eyed vireo, Vireo olivaceus
Black-whiskered vireo, Vireo altiloquus

Shrikes
Order: PasseriformesFamily: Laniidae

Shrikes are passerines known for their habit of catching other birds and small animals and impaling the uneaten portions of their bodies on thorns. A shrike's beak is hooked, like that of a typical a bird of prey.

Loggerhead shrike, Lanius ludovicianus

Crows, jays, and magpies
Order: PasseriformesFamily: Corvidae

The family Corvidae includes crows, ravens, jays, choughs, magpies, treepies, nutcrackers, and ground jays. Corvids are above average in size among the Passeriformes and some of the larger species show high levels of intelligence.

Blue jay, Cyanocitta cristata
American crow, Corvus brachyrhynchos
Fish crow, Corvus ossifragus

Tits, chickadees, and titmice
Order: PasseriformesFamily: Paridae

The Paridae are mainly small stocky woodland species with short stout bills. Some have crests. They are adaptable birds, with a mixed diet including seeds and insects.

Tufted titmouse, Baeolophus bicolor

Larks
Order: PasseriformesFamily: Alaudidae

Larks are small terrestrial birds with often extravagant songs and display flights. Most larks are fairly dull in appearance. Their food is insects and seeds.

Horned lark, Eremophila alpestris

Swallows
Order: PasseriformesFamily: Hirundinidae

The family Hirundinidae is adapted to aerial feeding. They have a slender streamlined body, long pointed wings, and a short bill with a wide gape. The feet are adapted to perching rather than walking, and the front toes are partly joined at the base.

Bank swallow, Riparia riparia
Tree swallow, Tachycineta bicolor
Bahama swallow, Tachycineta cyaneovirdis 
Northern rough-winged swallow, Stelgidopteryx serripennis
Purple martin, Progne subis
Barn swallow, Hirundo rustica
Cliff swallow, Petrochelidon pyrrhonota
Cave swallow, Petrochelidon fulva

Kinglets
Order: PasseriformesFamily: Regulidae

The kinglets are a small family of birds which resemble the titmice. They are very small insectivorous birds in the genus Regulus. The adults have colored crowns, giving rise to their name.

Ruby-crowned kinglet, Corthylio calendula

Waxwings
Order: PasseriformesFamily: Bombycillidae

The waxwings are a group of birds with soft silky plumage and unique red tips to some of the wing feathers. In the Bohemian and cedar waxwings, these tips look like sealing wax and give the group its name. These are arboreal birds of northern forests. They live on insects in summer and berries in winter.

Cedar waxwing, Bombycilla cedrorum

Nuthatches
Order: PasseriformesFamily: Sittidae

Nuthatches are small woodland birds. They have the unusual ability to climb down trees head first, unlike most other birds which can only go upwards. Nuthatches have big heads, short tails, and powerful bills and feet.

Brown-headed nuthatch, Sitta pusilla

Gnatcatchers
Order: PasseriformesFamily: Polioptilidae

The family Polioptilidae is a group of small insectivorous passerine birds containing the gnatcatchers and gnatwrens.

Blue-gray gnatcatcher, Polioptila caerulea

Wrens
Order: PasseriformesFamily: Troglodytidae

Wrens are small and inconspicuous birds, except for their loud songs. They have short wings and thin down-turned bills. Several species often hold their tails upright. All are insectivorous.

Carolina wren, Thryothorus ludovicianus
House wren, Troglodytes aedon
Sedge wren, Cistothorus platensis
Marsh wren, Cistothorus palustris

Mockingbirds and thrashers
Order: PasseriformesFamily: Mimidae

The mimids are a family of passerine birds which includes thrashers, mockingbirds, tremblers, and the New World catbirds. They are notable for their vocalization, especially their remarkable ability to mimic a wide variety of birds and other sounds heard outdoors. The species tend towards dull grays and browns in their appearance.

Gray catbird, Dumetella carolinensis
Brown thrasher, Toxostoma rufum
Bahama mockingbird, Mimus gundlachii 
Northern mockingbird, Mimus polyglottos

Starlings
Order: PasseriformesFamily: Sturnidae

Starlings are small to medium-sized passerines with strong feet. Their flight is strong and direct and they are very gregarious. Their preferred habitat is open country, and they eat insects and fruit. Their plumage is typically dark with a metallic sheen.

European starling, Sturnus vulgaris (I)
Common myna, Acridotheres tristis (I)

Thrushes and allies
Order: PasseriformesFamily: Turdidae

The thrushes are a group of passerine birds that occur mainly but not exclusively in the Old World. They are plump, soft plumaged, small to medium-sized insectivores or sometimes omnivores, often feeding on the ground. Many have attractive songs.

Eastern bluebird, Sialia sialis
Mountain bluebird, Sialia currucoides 
Veery, Catharus fuscescens
Gray-cheeked thrush, Catharus minimus
Swainson's thrush, Catharus ustulatus
Hermit thrush, Catharus guttatus
Wood thrush, Hylocichla mustelina 
American robin, Turdus migratorius

Old World flycatchers
Order: PasseriformesFamily: Muscicapidae

The Old World flycatchers form a large family of small passerine birds. These are mainly small arboreal insectivores, many of which, as the name implies, take their prey on the wing.

Northern wheatear, Oenanthe oenanthe

Old World sparrows
Order: PasseriformesFamily: Passeridae

Old World sparrows are small passerine birds. In general, sparrows tend to be small plump brownish or grayish birds with short tails and short powerful beaks. Sparrows are seed eaters, but they also consume small insects.

House sparrow, Passer domesticus (I)

Wagtails and pipits
Order: PasseriformesFamily: Motacillidae

Motacillidae is a family of small passerine birds with medium to long tails. They include the wagtails, longclaws, and pipits. They are slender ground-feeding insectivores of open country.

American pipit, Anthus rubescens

Finches, euphonias, and allies
Order: PasseriformesFamily: Fringillidae

Finches are seed-eating passerines. They are small to moderately large and have strong, usually conical and sometimes very large, beaks. All have twelve tail feathers and nine primaries. They have a bouncing flight with alternating bouts of flapping and gliding on closed wings, and most sing well.

House finch, Haemorhous mexicanus 
Pine siskin, Spinus pinus 
American goldfinch, Spinus tristis

Longspurs and snow buntings
Order: PasseriformesFamily: Calcariidae

The Calcariidae are a group of passerine birds that were traditionally grouped with the New World sparrows, but differ in a number of respects and are usually found in open grassy areas.

Lapland longspur, Calcarius lapponicus

New World sparrows
Order: PasseriformesFamily: Passerellidae

Until 2017, these species were considered part of the family Emberizidae. Most of the species are known as sparrows, but these birds are not closely related to the Old World sparrows which are in the family Passeridae. Many of these have distinctive head patterns.

Bachman's sparrow, Peucaea aestivalis 
Grasshopper sparrow, Ammodramus savannarum
Lark sparrow, Chondestes grammacus
Lark bunting, Calamospiza melanocorys 
Chipping sparrow, Spizella passerina
Clay-colored sparrow, Spizella pallida 
Field sparrow, Spizella pusilla
Dark-eyed junco, Junco hyemalis 
White-crowned sparrow, Zonotrichia leucophrys 
White-throated sparrow, Zonotrichia albicollis 
Vesper sparrow, Pooecetes gramineus 
LeConte's sparrow, Ammospiza leconteii 
Seaside sparrow, Ammospiza maritima 
Nelson's sparrow, Ammospiza nelsoni 
Saltmarsh sparrow, Ammospiza caudacuta
Savannah sparrow, Passerculus sandwichensis
Song sparrow, Melospiza melodia 
Lincoln's sparrow, Melospiza lincolnii 
Swamp sparrow, Melospiza georgiana
Eastern towhee, Pipilo erythrophthalmus

Spindalises
Order: PasseriformesFamily: Spindalidae

The members of this small family are native to the Greater Antilles. One species occurs fairly frequently in Florida.

Western spindalis, Spindalis zena

Yellow-breasted chat
Order: PasseriformesFamily: Icteriidae

This species was historically placed in the wood-warblers (Parulidae) but nonetheless most authorities were unsure if it belonged there. It was placed in its own family in 2017.

Yellow-breasted chat, Icteria virens

Troupials and allies
Order: PasseriformesFamily: Icteridae

The icterids are a group of small to medium-sized, often colorful, passerines restricted to the New World, including the grackles, New World blackbirds, and New World orioles. Most have black as a predominant plumage color, often enlivened by yellow, orange, or red.

Yellow-headed blackbird, Xanthocephalus xanthocephalus 
Bobolink, Dolichonyx oryzivorus
Eastern meadowlark, Sturnella magna
Orchard oriole, Icterus spurius
Bullock's oriole, Icterus bullockii 
Spot-breasted oriole, Icterus pectoralis (I) 
Baltimore oriole, Icterus galbula
Red-winged blackbird, Agelaius phoeniceus
Shiny cowbird, Molothrus bonariensis 
Bronzed cowbird, Molothrus aeneus 
Brown-headed cowbird, Molothrus ater
Rusty blackbird, Euphagus carolinus 
Brewer's blackbird, Euphagus cyanocephalus 
Common grackle, Quiscalus quiscula
Boat-tailed grackle, Quiscalus major

New World warblers
Order: PasseriformesFamily: Parulidae

The wood-warblers are a group of small, often colorful, passerines restricted to the New World. Most are arboreal, but some are terrestrial. Most members of this family are insectivores.

Ovenbird, Seiurus aurocapilla
Worm-eating warbler, Helmitheros vermivorum
Louisiana waterthrush, Parkesia motacilla
Northern waterthrush, Parkesia noveboracensis
Golden-winged warbler, Vermivora chrysoptera 
Blue-winged warbler, Vermivora cyanoptera 
Black-and-white warbler, Mniotilta varia
Prothonotary warbler, Protonotaria citrea
Swainson's warbler, Limnothlypis swainsonii 
Tennessee warbler, Leiothlypis peregrina
Orange-crowned warbler, Leiothlypis celata
Nashville warbler, Leiothlypis ruficapilla 
Connecticut warbler, Oporornis agilis 
Mourning warbler, Geothlypis philadelphia 
Kentucky warbler, Geothlypis formosa 
Common yellowthroat, Geothlypis trichas
Hooded warbler, Setophaga citrina
American redstart, Setophaga ruticilla
Cape May warbler, Setophaga tigrina
Cerulean warbler, Setophaga cerulea 
Northern parula, Setophaga americana
Magnolia warbler, Setophaga magnolia
Bay-breasted warbler, Setophaga castanea
Blackburnian warbler, Setophaga fusca
Yellow warbler, Setophaga petechia
Chestnut-sided warbler, Setophaga pensylvanica 
Blackpoll warbler, Setophaga striata
Black-throated blue warbler, Setophaga caerulescens
Palm warbler, Setophaga palmarum
Pine warbler, Setophaga pinus
Yellow-rumped warbler, Setophaga coronata
Yellow-throated warbler, Setophaga dominica
Prairie warbler, Setophaga discolor
Black-throated gray warbler, Setophaga nigrescens 
Black-throated green warbler, Setophaga virens
Canada warbler, Cardellina canadensis 
Wilson's warbler, Cardellina pusilla

Cardinals and allies
Order: PasseriformesFamily: Cardinalidae

The cardinals are a family of robust, seed-eating birds with strong bills. They are typically associated with open woodland. The sexes usually have distinct plumages.

Summer tanager, Piranga rubra
Scarlet tanager, Piranga olivacea
Western tanager, Piranga ludoviciana
Northern cardinal, Cardinalis cardinalis
Rose-breasted grosbeak, Pheucticus ludovicianus
Black-headed grosbeak, Pheucticus melanocephalus 
Blue grosbeak, Passerina caerulea
Lazuli bunting, Passerina amoena 
Indigo bunting, Passerina cyanea
Painted bunting, Passerina ciris
Dickcissel, Spiza americana

Tanagers and allies
Order: PasseriformesFamily: Thraupidae

The tanagers are a large group of small to medium-sized passerine birds restricted to the New World, mainly in the tropics. Many species are brightly colored. As a family they are omnivorous, but individual species specialize in eating fruits, seeds, insects, or other types of food. Most have short, rounded wings.

Bananaquit, Coereba flaveola 
Yellow-faced grassquit, Tiaris olivaceus 
Black-faced grassquit, Melanospiza bicolor

See also
List of birds of Florida
List of North American birds
List of invasive species in the Everglades
Reptiles of Florida
List of amphibians of Florida

Notes

References

Further reading

External links
Florida Ornithological Society
Invasive Birds
Pictures of birds of Florida

Birds, Everglades National Park
Florida, Everglades
Everglades National Park